Nina Rønsted (Nina Astrid Helene Rønsted) is a Danish botanist, who is Director of Science and Conservation at The National Tropical Botanical Garden, Hawaii.

Career 
Following completion of her PhD in Pharmaceutical Science she worked as a postdoctoral and then international fellow at the Royal Botanic Gardens, Kew (2003–2007), including spending 16 months on secondment to the Department of Plant Biology, University of Minnesota US, before returning to work at the University of Copenhagen as an assistant professor in the Department of Medicinal Chemistry (2008–2011). Since 2012 she has been at her current position as an associate professor and since 2015 full professor. In 2019 she was appointed as Director of Science and Conservation at The National Tropical Botanical Garden (NTBG) in Kalāheo, Hawaii on the island of Kauaʻi. She is known for her work on the taxonomy and phylogeny of monocotyledons.

Selected publications 

 
 
 
 
 Nina Rønsted, Dimitri Zubov, Sam Bruun-Lund, Aaron P. Davis. Snowdrops falling slowly into place: An improved phylogeny for Galanthus (Amaryllidaceae). Molecular Phylogenetics and Evolution Volume 69, Issue 1, October 2013, Pages 205–217* 
* Maja Mellergaard Larsen, Anne Adsersen, Aaron P. Davis, M. Dolores Lledó, Anna K. Jäger, Nina Rønsted. Using a phylogenetic approach to selection of target plants in drug discovery of acetylcholinesterase inhibiting alkaloids in Amaryllidaceae tribe GalantheaeBiochemical Systematics and Ecology Volume 38, Issue 5, October 2010, Pages 1026–1034
  (1998): Mauritian red nectar remains a mystery. Nature 393(6685): 529.  PDF fulltext
 
  In

References

Bibliography

External links 
 Official Webpage
 Publications on ResearchGate

21st-century Danish botanists
Living people
Year of birth missing (living people)
Botanists active in Kew Gardens
Danish women botanists